Buena Vista Social Club Presents Ibrahim Ferrer is the first studio album by Cuban singer Ibrahim Ferrer. It was released on June 8, 1999, through World Circuit, and was one of the top ten selling Latin albums in the US in that year.

Recording
The album was recorded in March, 1998.

Critical reception

AllMusic reviewer David Lavin commented: "Ferrer's album is pleasant, the kind of album you could put on during brunch on a sunny morning. (…) One standout is "Mami Me Gusto," a rolling upbeat tune by the legendary Cuban composer/bandleader Arsenio Rodríguez. (…) The rest of the album is nice, but rarely as inspired or joyous as the original Buena Vista release. If you're looking for classy cocktail party music that will hold the attention of music fans, and won't bother the uninterested, look no further."

In his review for fRoots magazine, Jon Lusk stated: "The new album strikes a perfect balance between continuity and innovation. There's still that suave subtle old-time acoustic vibe, but there are also plenty of pleasant surprises. (…) Ferrer is said to have hankered to do more boleros throughout his career, and his wish is finally granted here in abundance. The slower tempos predominate, though there are also wonderful examples of guaguancó, son and guajira. The choice of composers reflects his personal history as the little man in the background who has finally got to make the hit album he always wanted."

At the 42nd Annual Grammy Awards in 2000, Buena Vista Social Club Presents Ibrahim Ferrer received a nomination for Best Tropical Traditional Latin Performance. At the 2000 Billboard Latin Music Awards, the album  won the award for Tropical Album of the Year by a New Artist and was nominated Tropical Album of the Year by a Male Artist.

Track listing

 "Bruca Maniguá" (Arsenio Rodríguez) – 4:44
 "Herido De Sombras" (Pedro Vega Francia) – 4:11
 "Marieta" (Faustino Oramas) – 5:55
 "Guateque Campesino" (Celia Romero) – 5:09
 "Mami Me Gustó" (Arsenio Rodríguez) – 5:04
 "Nuestra Ultima Cita" (Armando Medina) – 3:56
 "Cienfuegos Tiene Su Guaguanco" (Victor Lay) – 5:22
 "Silencio" (Rafael Hernández) – 4:38
 "Aquellos Ojos Verdes" (Nilo Menendez / Adolfo Utrera) – 4:54
 "Qué Bueno Baila Usted" (Benny Moré) – 4:39
 "Como Fue" (Ernesto Duarte) – 3:33

Charts

Weekly charts

Year-end charts

Certifications

Personnel

Musicians
 Ibrahim Ferrer – vocals
 Rubén González – piano
 Manuel Galbán – electric guitar
 Orlando "Cachaíto" López – bass
 Amadito Valdés – timbales
 Ángel Terry Domech – congas
 Roberto García – bongos
 Carlos González – bongos
 Alberto "Virgilio" Valdés – maracas
 Ibrahim Ferrer Jr. – clave
 Ry Cooder – electric guitar
 Joachim Cooder – udu drum, dumbek and drums
 Gil Bernal – tenor saxophone
 Lázaro Ordóñez Enríquez – violin
 Eliades Ochoa – guitar
 Papi Oviedo – tres
 Barbarito Torres – laúd
 Manuel "Guajiro" Mirabal – trumpet
 Octavio Calderón – trumpet
 Carmelo González – trumpet
 Yanko Pisaco Pichardo – trumpet
 Alejandro Pichardo Pérez – trumpet
 Daniel Ramos – trumpet
 Jesús "Aguaje" Ramos – trombone 
 Jorge Leal – trombone
 Alberto Muñoz – trombone
 Carlos Montenegro Ruíz – alto saxophone
 José Ramírez Nurque – alto saxophone
 Antonio Francisco Jiménez Sánchez – tenor saxophone
 Braulio Hernández Rodríguez – tenor saxophone
 Adrian Corzo González – tenor saxophone
 Julián Corrales Subidá – 1st violin
 Alyoth Marichal Castillo – 1st violin
 Pedro Depestre González – 1st violin
 José Conyedo Román – 1st violin
 José Pérez Fuentes – 2nd violin
 Ariel Sarduy Méndez – 2nd violin
 Rogelio Martínez Muguercia – 2nd violin
 Humberto Legat Yera – 2nd violin
 Lenor Bermúdez Bermúdez – viola
 Rafael Cutiño Diequez – viola
 Angél Zaldívar Copello – viola, cello
 Roy Ávila Serrano – cello
 Andrés Escalona Graña – bass
 Aleida Espinosa – bass

Singers
 Pío Leyva  – chorus vocals
 Manuel "Puntillita" Licea  – chorus vocals
 José Antonio "Maceo" Rodríguez  – vocals, chorus vocals
 Lázaro Villa – chorus vocals
 Teresa García Caturla – chorus vocals
 Omara Portuondo – chorus vocals
 Michelle Alderete Espigul – vocals (Gema Cuatro)
 Estela Guzmán Vega – vocals (Gema Cuatro)
 Laura Flores Hernández – vocals (Gema Cuatro)
 Odette Tellería Orduña – vocals (Gema Cuatro)

Production
 Ry Cooder – producer
 Nick Gold – executive producer
 Juan de Marcos González – consultant and coordinator
 Jerry Boys – engineer, mixing, mastering
 Tom Leader – assistant mastering engineer
 Jenny Adlington – project manager
 Francesca Clarke – translation
 Sigfredo Ariel – song transcriptions and research
 Karl Halmel – photography
 Susan Titelman – photography
 Donata Wenders – photography
 The Team – design

See also

1999 in Latin music
List of number-one Billboard Tropical Albums from the 1990s

References

External links
 

1999 debut albums
Ibrahim Ferrer albums
Spanish-language albums
Nonesuch Records albums
World Circuit (record label) albums